The Philadelphia Freedom Concert and Ball was an HIV/AIDS awareness fund raising event that was held in Philadelphia, United States, on July 4, 2005.

The ball was held at the Philadelphia Museum of Art prior to the multi-act concert.  Tickets were $1,000 each and included numerous celebrities, including, the orchestrator of the event, Elton John.  Chefs from the city provided food and entertainment was provided by local groups. The concert itself was held outside the museum, using the stage from the Live 8 concert only a few days before.  VIP tickets costing $500 allowed people to sit in 25 rows set up in front of the stage; otherwise, it was a standing only event. Over a million people attended.

The concert was hosted by Wayne Brady and Bruce Vilanch and included other guests, such as Billie Jean King.  Performing were Bryan Adams, Patti LaBelle, Rufus Wainwright, Peter Nero and the Philly Pops, culminating with a performance by Elton John (who was introduced by long-time friend and AIDS activist Billie Jean King).  Elton opened with "The Bitch Is Back", followed by "Bennie and the Jets", "Rocket Man", "I Guess That's Why They Call It The Blues", "Tiny Dancer", and ended with "Philadelphia Freedom" with the Philadelphia Pops.  The concert was followed by a fireworks display.

References 

2005 in music
Culture of Philadelphia
History of Philadelphia
2005 in Pennsylvania
2005 in Philadelphia
Museums in popular culture
Live 8 events
2005 in American music